FK Metalurg is a football club from Skopje, North Macedonia. They are currently not playing in any of the four highest tiers of Macedonian football.

History
The club was founded in 1964.

Metalurg has entered the Macedonian First League in the 1992–93 season and were relegated the same year. After playing 15 seasons in the Macedonian Second League they were back in the Macedonian First League for the 2008–09 season. In the 2009–10 season they finished in 3rd place and played in Europe for the first time in club history. In 2015–16 season Metalurg was relegated from the First League after 8 seasons.

Season-by-season record
A season-by-season record of Metalurg league performances:

Metalurg in Europe
 Q = qualifier

Historical list of coaches

 Nikola Ilievski (1991 - 1992)
 Slavche Vojneski (1998 - 1999)
 Baze Lazarevski (2007 - Oct 2008)
 Gjore Jovanovski (26 Oct 2008 - Nov 2009)
 Nikola Ilievski (22 Nov 2009 - 12 Dec 2009)
 Zikica Tasevski (13 Dec 2009 - 3 Oct 2011)
 Gjorgji Hristov (3 Oct 2011 - Nov 2012)
 Srgjan Zaharievski (20 Nov 2012 - 30 Jun 2015)
 Marjan Gerasimovski (1 Jul 2015 - 31 Aug 2015)
 Alekso Mackov (2 Sep 2015 - Jun 2016)

Honours

 Macedonian Republic League:
Winners (1): 1987

 Macedonian First League:
Runners-up (3): 2010–11, 2011–12, 2012–13

 Macedonian Second League:
Runners-up (2): 1993–94, 2007–08

 Macedonian Football Cup:
Winners (1): 2010–11
Runners-up (1): 2013–14

 Macedonian Football Supercup:
Runners-up (1): 2011

References

External links
Club info at Macedonian Football 
Football Federation of Macedonia 
Makedonski fudbal 

 
Football clubs in Skopje
Association football clubs established in 1964
1964 establishments in the Socialist Republic of Macedonia